Ekibastuz Airport  is an airport in Kazakhstan located  south-west of Ekibastuz. It usually handles small airliners.

External links
RussianAirFields.com

Airport
Airports built in the Soviet Union
Airports in Kazakhstan